Staphylococcus condimenti is a Gram-positive, coagulase-negative member of the bacterial genus Staphylococcus consisting of single, paired, and clustered cocci.  Strains of this species were originally isolated from fermenting soy sauce mash and are positive for catalase, urease, arginine dihydrolase, nitrate reductase, beta-galactosidase, and phosphatase activity.

Unlike some clinical Staphylococcus isolates and some food-derived strains, S. condimenti has shown no noticeable resistance to antibiotics including lincomycin and penicillin.

References

External links
Type strain of Staphylococcus condimenti at BacDive -  the Bacterial Diversity Metadatabase

condimenti
Bacteria described in 1998